Football Club Livyi Bereh Kyiv is a Ukrainian football club from Kyiv. The club is based at the Kyiv's Osokorky neighborhood located at the left-bank of Dnipro, hence Livyi Bereh (left-bank). It hosts its games in the Kyiv's suburb of Hnidyn, just outside of the city limits. In June 2021, the club was admitted to the Second League.

History 
The club was created in September 2017 by Mykola Lavrenko, a former president of Polihraftekhnika Oleksandriya (today FC Oleksandriya) and retired Ukrainian manager Mykola Pavlov. To the club was also brought another Ukrainian manager Anatoliy Buznyk who is known for managing the Ukraine national student football team at Summer Universiades. Buznik in the club serves roles of both manager and sports director.

Livyi Bereh Kyiv made a late entry to national competition of the 2020–21 Ukrainian Football Amateur League replacing FC imeni Lva Yashina during winter break. The club made its debut at national level on 24 April 2021 hosting FC Olimpiya Savyntsi and beating it 2:1.

Being accepted to the Ukrainian Second League, the club had listed number of Ukrainian veteran footballers and Universiade winners, among which were Vitaliy Reva, Oleksandr Akymenko, Artem Starhorodskyi, Andriy Zaporozhan and others.

Players

Current squad

Head coaches 

  Anatoliy Buznyk (1 August 2020 – 31 March 2022)

References

External links 
 Official website
 Team's profile at the Kyiv Oblast Association of Football

 
Association football clubs established in 2017
2017 establishments in Ukraine
Football clubs in Kyiv
Ukrainian Second League clubs
Sport in Kyiv